Bendish is a hamlet in Hertfordshire, England.

Bendish may also refer to:

Bendish baronets
Thomas Bendish
Bridget Bendish